The fourth USS Morris was a schooner in the United States Navy in commission from 1846 to 1848. She was named for Robert Morris, a Founding Father, Continental Congressman, and major financier of the American Revolutionary War.

U.S. naval forces captured the Mexican schooner Laura Virginia in the Gulf of Mexico in October 1846 during the Mexican War. She was taken into the U.S. Navy and renamed Morris.

Morris was sold at the end of the Mexican War in 1848.

References

Mexican–American War ships of the United States
Age of Sail ships of the United States
Schooners of the United States Navy
1846 ships
Vessels captured by the United States Navy
Ships of Mexico
Ships named for Founding Fathers of the United States